Fotbal Club Prahova Ploiești,, commonly known as Prahova Ploiești or simply as Prahova, is a Romanian football club based in Ploiești, Prahova County. Prahova was founded in 1909 under the name of United Ploiești and it became soon one of the best teams in the country, winning one Romanian Championship in 1912. The club was dissolved in 2001, by the indolence of the private businessmen that took over the club after the 1989 Romanian revolution and it was refounded in 2018.

History
The club was founded in 1909, under the name of United Ploiești, by the American and Dutch functionaries from the Petroleum Refineries, under the presidency of engineer Jacob Koppes. The first players of the club were: Braizer, the Mayor brothers, Bider, Kolman, van Beck, Meyer, Bolton. In 1911 the first Romanian player appears in the squad, Vintilescu. At the end of the 1911–12 season the club were crowned champions, winning at Ploiești against Olympia București with 6–2. The team from Bucharest played with only 9 players because, the two other players were schoolboys, and their parents didn't allow them to go to the away game. Starting with 1914, the foreign players left the country and United sees itself dissolved just before World War I started. The remaining players and staff were divided between two clubs, Româno-Americană București and Prahova Ploiești.

In 1915 Jacob Koppes, refounded the club, under the name of Prahova Ploiești. In 1915–16 the team succeeded to win the national title once again. The crest of the club was represented by a black goat and the jersey colours were blue-yellow-white.

After World War I it resumed its activity alongside the teams from Bucharest, participating at the national championship in the system of a final tournament, with the regional championships and league championships, between 1919–1932. During this period, its best performance was to win the South League Championship in 1931, using the following players: Zaharescu – Barasch, Ionescu Nălae – Vasilescu (Muller), Dancher, Popescu, Obretcovici, Rheingruber, Georgescu, Taryan, I. Niculescu, Atanasiu. In the national championship tournament, 1930–31, te team reaches the semifinals where it loses 2–3 to UD Reșița, and is eliminated.

Starting with 1934, Prahova played in the Second Division (1934–1936), then in the Third Division (1936–1937) and again in the Second Division (1937–1941), the players used, among others, were: Iordăchescu, Șenchea, Dunăreanu, Rusen, Gh. Dragomirescu, Grun, Pascaru, Epure, T. Georgescu, Bujor, Farkas, Criciotoiu, Boldiș, Radu Florian, and in the period of World War II: Ioanid, Panovschi, Boacă, Șperlea, Bușac, T. Păunescu, I. Manolescu, N. Antonescu, V. Bărbulescu, Lipănescu, E. Vlaiculescu, Gh. Ionescu, R. Gologan.

In 1946, after a double play-off match against Gloria CFR Galați (3–0, 2–1), the team promoted to the First Division, the players used were: C. Mihăilescu, Balmuș, Hrisafi, Matroc, Șt. Comănescu, Boacă, Vâlvoi II, Catană, M. Beraru, Mladin, Comșa, M. Ionescu, Șt. Georgescu, Mazăre, Gologan, Vlaiculescu, Deliu, Mihăescu. The leadership was secured by: B. Andrei, Gh. Marinescu, N. Stanbolgiu, Tr. Stoenescu, Tr. Popescu. After only one season, 1946–47, it relegates to the Second Division and in 1947 merges with Concordia, the team of the Factory from Ploiești with the same name. New players in the squad are: Asadur, Ștefănescu, Mincea, Teașcă, Șt. Vasile, Mărdărescu, Chilea, Gârlea, Gh. Ionescu, Moldoveanu, Bădulescu-Bardatz, Motronea, Sanilovici.

The divisionary direction of the team was constant in the Second Division, but with consecutive name changes: Partizanul (1950), Flacăra (1951–1953), Metalul (1954), Flacăra 1 Mai (1955), Metalul 1 Mai (1956), Energia 1 Mai (1956–1958), and in 1958 comes back to its traditional name Prahova.

At the end of the 1962–1963 season the team was excluded from the Second Division after some competition disorders, and relegated in the towns championship.

In 1968 Prahova promoted to Third Division and in 1975 to the Second Division where it stays until 1978. Will come back in the Third Division in 1983 and in 1984 the club changes its name to Prahova CSU. The decline was accentuated after 1989 when the club was relegated to the Third Division in 1991 and in 1995 in the regional championship. Without any material support in 1997 the club merges with a police club, Dinamo Argus Ploiești, changing its name to Prahova Argus Ploiești. In 2000 the club is moved to Urlați, and after this dissolution comes quickly.

In August 2018, the club was refounded and enrolled in Liga C – Prahova (Mizil Series), the equivalent of the 7th tier. At the end of the season it finished on the second place, which allowed the club to promote to the 6th league Liga B – Prahova, East Series.

Grounds

Prahova Ploiești used to play its home matches on Prahova Stadium in Ploiești, with a capacity of 4,000 places. After the 2001 dissolution of the club, the stadium was bought by Ioan Niculae, owner of Astra Giurgiu and used by this club as a secondary ground. After the 2018 refoundation, Prahova negotiated to move back on its home ground, but the negotiations failed, so it played on Conpet Stadium in Strejnicu, with a capacity of 1,732 seats, then on Voința Stadium in Ciorani, with a capacity of 1,000 seats.

Honours
Liga I:
Winners (2): 1911–12, 1915–16
Runners-up (1): 1910–11

Liga III:
Winners (2): 1974–75, 1981–82
Runners-up (2): 1979–80, 1980–81

Liga VII – Prahova County:
Runners-up (1): 2018–19

References

Association football clubs established in 1909
Football clubs in Romania
Football clubs in Prahova County
Liga I clubs
Liga II clubs
Liga III clubs
Liga IV clubs
1909 establishments in Romania